Sajal Aly (born 17 January 1994) is a Pakistani  actress and model who predominantly appears in Pakistani television and films. Aly received several accolades including five Hum Awards and was considered one of Pakistan's highest-paid actresses. She began her acting career with Geo TV's comedy Nadaaniyaan in 2009 and later on appeared in breakout role of ARY Digital's drama Mehmoodabad Ki Malkain in 2011. 

Aly has done some variety of work and is best known for her portrayals of Dr. Zubiya Asfandyar in Yaqeen Ka Safar (2017), Momina Sultan in Alif (2019), Noor-ul-Ain Zaman in Yeh Dil Mera (2019-2020) and Rabia Safeer in Sinf-e-Aahan (2021) all of which her performance was better received.

Early life and family 
Aly has one sister Saboor Ali, who is also an actress and one brother. In 2017 Sajal's mother, Rahat died of cancer. She is married her co-star and actor Ahad Raza Mir in March 2020. The couple were legally divorced in March 2022.

Career

Early career (2009–2011) 
 
Sajal Aly made her acting debut in the year 2009 through a comedy drama Nadaaniyaan which aired on Geo TV. She played the character of Sumbul in Yasir Nawaz's directed drama. In 2011, Sajal featured in Express Entertainment's drama serial Chandni and played her first lead character Chandni for which she received huge appreciation from the audience. She received praise for her breakout role in the 2011 ARY Digital's family drama Mehmoodabad Ki Malkain.

Breakthrough & recognition (2012–2016) 
Subsequently, she rose to prominence for portraying leading roles in several successful television series, including the comedy Mohabbat Jaye Bhar Mein (2012), the romances Sitamgar (2012), and Meri Ladli (2012), the family comedy Quddusi Sahab Ki Bewah (2013), and the drama Gul-e-Rana (2015). Her performance in the teen drama Nanhi (2013), the psychological Sannata (2013), the revenge drama Chup Raho (2014) and the spiritual romance Khuda Dekh Raha Hai (2015), earned her widespread recognition as well as the Lux Style Award for Best Actress nominations. Sajal garnered critical acclaim for portraying a troubled child in the telefilm Behadd (2013), and an aspiring actress in the relationship drama Zindagi Kitni Haseen Hay (2016), her first feature film.

Rise to prominence (2016–present) 
 
Sajal made her Bollywood film debut starring opposite Sridevi in the 2017 Hindi film Mom. Aly also sang the theme song for the series O Rangreza, in which she plays the character Sassi. She portrays the role of Chammi in 2018 period drama Aangan of Hum TV. In 2019 Aly was seen portraying Momina Sultan in Geo Entertainment spiritual romantic drama Alif alongside Hamza Ali Abbasi. As of 2019–2020, she appeared in Yeh Dil Mera as Noor-ul-Ain Zaman in Hum TV. In 2021, Sajal appeared on the silver screen as Zara in Urdu-language drama Pakistani film  Khel Khel Mein' opposite Bilal Abbas Khan. The film was written and directed by Fizza Ali Meerza.

Filmography

Films

Television

Telefilm

Web series

Awards and nominations

References

External links 

 
 

Living people
1994 births
Actresses from Lahore
Pakistani female models
Pakistani film actresses
Pakistani television actresses
Actresses in Urdu cinema
Actresses in Hindi cinema
Pakistani expatriate actresses in India
21st-century Pakistani actresses